The Hokkien language has two regularly used sets of numerals, a colloquial or native Hokkien system and literary system. Literary and colloquial systems are not totally mutually independent; they are sometimes mixed used.

Basic numerals

Cardinal numbers
For cardinal numbers usage, the colloquial system is usually used. For example, one should use chi̍t ê lâng for the meaning of "a person" instead of using *it ê lâng. However, a notable exceptions for numerals 1 and 2 appears while the number is greater than 10.

For "few hundred and ten, twenty or thirty" or "few thousand and few hundred", in Hokkien the prefixes pah- or chheng- are used instead of the lengthy way, which requires the speaker to state "how many chheng, how many pah, and how many cha̍p".

Fractional numerals
For expressing fractions, one should use the sentence pattern like "cardinal number + hun-chi + cardinal number"; for example, gō͘ hun-chi it (五分之一) for "one fifth" (1/5). Note that the colloquial set of numerals is used in fractional numerals with still the exception of numerals 1 and 2, which should use the literary set as it and jī.

For expressing decimals, one should only use the literary numeral set with tiám (點) for the decimal mark. For example, one may say π equals sam tiám it-sù-it-ngó͘-kiú-jī-lio̍k-ngó͘-sam (3.141592653).

In addition, some special fraction can be expressed in other simpler forms. For percentage, one can still use the sentence pattern of hun-chi as pah hun-chi cha̍p (百分之十) for "ten percent" in most situations; however, for native speakers, the suffix -siâⁿ (成) for "n×10 percents" is used more commonly, so the "twenty percents" should be nn̄g-siâⁿ (兩成). Note that the numeral set used with the suffix -siâⁿ is totally the colloquial one with no exception.

In Taiwan, the term pha-sian-to͘ is also used for fractional numerals, but one should use the sentence term as "cardinal number + ê pha-sian-to͘"; for example, chhit-cha̍p ê pha-sian-to͘ (70%). The term was introduced in Japanese rule era from Japanese language; it's a Japanese loanword originating from English with the meaning of "percent" (paasento; パーセント). The use of pha-sian-to͘ is sometimes simplified as a suffix -pha; for example, cha̍p-peh-pha (18%).

Ordinal numbers
For ordinal numbers, when the numerals are preceded by the prefix tē (第), the colloquial set is used with the exception of numeral 1 and 2; when the numerals are preceded by the prefix thâu (頭), there is no exception to use the colloquial set when the number is smaller than 10, but once the number is greater than 10, the exception of numeral 1 and 2 appears again. Note that the system with prefix thâu is usually added by counter words, and it means "the first few"; for example, thâu-gō͘ pái means "the first five times". Thâu-chhit (number seven) sometimes means thâu-chhit kang (first seven days). It means the first seven days after a person died, which is a Hokkien cultural noun that should usually be avoided.

Smaller than 10

Greater than 10

See also
Hokkien counter word

References

N
Numerals
Hokkien
Southern Min